Serafim Saca (16 March 1935 – 20 May 2011) is a writer from Moldova. He is credited with being the author and director of several documentaries including House with Flowers (1965), Chiinau – 67 (1967), and Cross-Roads (1967).  He became a member of the Moldovan Writers' Union in 1966. He was forbidden to publish between 1976 and 1987.

Awards
 Premiul de Stat, 1987
 Ordinul "Gloria Muncii"

References

Bibliography
 Serafim Saka. Aici: atunci şi acum. Dialoguri. Prefaţă de Leo Butnaru. Chişinău, Editura Prut Internaţional, 2010.

External links 
  Serafim Saca
  Curriculum Vitae
  Serafim Saka, prozator, eseist, dramaturg
 Raportul Comisiei Cojocaru
 (AUDIO) IPSDD - Protagonist Serafim Saca, 27.06.2010
 Vitalie Ciobanu, Serafim Saca - un „spadasin” al interogaţiei intelectuale
 Serafim Saca
 Dan Mănucă, Parabola condiţiei umane. Serafim Saka
 Serafim Saka versus N. Dabija

1935 births
2011 deaths
People from Chernivtsi Oblast
Eastern Orthodox Christians from Romania
Moldova State University alumni
Moldovan writers
Moldovan male writers
Popular Front of Moldova
Popular Front of Moldova politicians
Recipients of the Order of Work Glory
People from Bethlehem